Grand Canal can refer to multiple waterways:

 Grand Canal (China) in eastern China
 Grand Canal (Ireland), between the River Shannon and Dublin in Ireland
 Grand Canal (Venice) in Venice, Italy
 Grand Canal d'Alsace in eastern France
Grand Canal (Phoenix) in Arizona, United States 
 GRAND Canal or Great Recycling and Northern Development Canal, proposed for Great Lakes region of North America
 The proposed Pan Korea Grand Waterway (한반도 대운하) in South Korea, sometimes referred to as the "Grand Canal"
 The proposed Nicaragua Grand Canal that would link the Caribbean Sea and the Pacific Ocean

Other 
 The Grand Canal (Streeton) – a 1908 painting by Arthur Streeton
 One of the playable boards in the Nintendo video game Mario Party 7